Pharmacists for Life International (PFLI) is an international pro-life organization advocating the rights of pharmacists who refuse to fill or dispense prescriptions for artificial, hormonal, or emergency contraception to "protect the rights of employees who hold religious beliefs". PFLI holds that no "employee should be forced to choose between their livelihood and their conscience". In the United States, at least six states have such conscience clauses for personnel in medical-related fields.

PFLI President Karen Brauer was fired in 1996 from a Kmart pharmacy in Delphi, Ohio for refusing to fill birth control prescriptions. The American Center for Law and Justice (ACLJ) represented Brauer and filed suit against Kmart in U.S. District Court in Cincinnati in August 1999. In January 2001, the court refused Kmart's request to dismiss the suit, ruling that Brauer's case could go forward under Ohio's conscience law.  On April 16, 2001, in an appearance on Fox News's The O'Reilly Factor, Brauer acknowledged that she did not directly decline or refuse to fill the prescription but, rather, lied to the customer by saying the pharmacy was out of stock of the contraceptive in question (Micronor), which Brauer holds is designed to "terminate a human life that has already begun". When the customer learned the truth she complained to the store's management, which led to the incident which in turn resulted in Brauer's lawsuit.

References

External links 
 PFLI website

Pharmacy-related professional associations
Anti-abortion organizations